The men's 100 metre breaststroke SB13 event at the 2020 Paralympic Games took place on 1 September 2021, at the Tokyo Aquatics Centre.

Heats
The swimmers with the top eight times, regardless of heat, advanced to the final.

Final

References

Swimming at the 2020 Summer Paralympics